Macrognathus pancalus, the barred spiny eel or Indian spiny eel, or পাঁকাল in bengali is a small freshwater fish in southern Asia. It usually is found in slow and shallow rivers. Males are more slender and often smaller than the females.

References

pancalus
Fish described in 1822